The following is a partial list of prominent members of the Irish Republican Brotherhood (IRB), circa 1858-1922.

Maurice Ahern, member of the Cork branch. 
William O'Mera Allen
Thomas Ashe, President of the Irish Republican Brotherhood from 1916 to 1917
Michael Barrett 
Piaras Béaslaí
James Bermingham
Gerald Boland
Harry Boland
James Boland
 Hugh Brady (1896-1977), Paradise Ballynacally Clare Brigade, sentenced to death by firing squad Killadysert, escaped 
Patrick William Nally 
Éamonn Ceannt, aka Eamonn Kent
Thomas J. Clarke, Treasurer at the time of the Easter Rising
Cornelius Colbert
Michael Collins
James Connolly, socialist and labour leader, joined prior to the Easter Rising
Patrick Curran, police informant 
Ned Daly
Michael Davitt
Éamon de Valera
Seamus Deakin, President of the Irish Republican Brotherhood from 1913 to 1914
Timothy Deasy
Charles Guilfoyle Doran
Edward Duffy
Thomas McCarthy Fennell
William Goold
Arthur Griffith
Michael Grimes, Irish scientist and first Professor of Microbiology at University College Cork
Bulmer Hobson
Martin Hogan, member of the IRB who deserted from the British Army to join the Fenian uprising
Thomas J. Kelly, President of the Irish Republican Brotherhood during 1866 and 1867.
Luke Kennedy, joined 1898
Charles Joseph Kickham, President of the Irish Republican Brotherhood from 1873 to 1882
Michael Larkin 
Diarmuid Lynch 
Seán Mac Diarmada, aka Sean MacDermott, Secretary at the time of the Easter Rising
Thomas MacDonagh
Seán MacEoin, joined 1914.  Minister for Justice 1948-1951, Minister for Defence 1953-1956.
Eamon Martin
Patrick McCartan
Denis McCullough, President of the Irish Republican Brotherhood from 1915 to 1916
Seán McGarry, President of the Irish Republican Brotherhood from 1917 until 1919
Liam Mellows
Michael McHugh, father of Maureen O'Carroll
Denis Dowling Mulcahy
John Mulholland, President of the Irish Republican Brotherhood from 1910 to 1912
Neal O'Boyle, President of the Irish Republican Brotherhood from 1907 until 191.
James Francis Xavier O'Brien, President of the Irish Republican Brotherhood from around 1869 until 1872
John O'Connor, President of the Irish Republican Brotherhood from around 1882 to 1891
Jeremiah O'Donovan Rossa
John O'Leary, President of the Irish Republican Brotherhood from around 1891 to 1907
John O'Mahony
Gearoid O'Sullivan
Ted O'Sullivan
Charles Stewart Parnell
Patrick Pearse
Joseph Mary Plunkett
John O'Connor Power
James Stephens
James Wilson
W. B. Yeats

References

 
Irish Republican Brotherhood, members